Tiền Phong (Vietnamese for pioneer) may refer to:
Tien Phong (newspaper)
Tien Phong Bank
Tiền Phong, Bắc Giang, a commune in Bắc Giang Province